Puerto Rico Highway 150 (PR-150) is a road that travels from Villalba, Puerto Rico to Coamo. This highway begins at PR-149 in downtown Villalba and ends at PR-14 in downtown Coamo.

Major intersections

See also

 List of highways numbered 150

References

External links
 

150